Torvill and Dean's Dancing on Ice: The Live Tour is a nationwide tour in the United Kingdom. It began in 2007 following the success of the two series of smash-hit television series Dancing on Ice,

It was confirmed on 24 November 2017 that the tour would return in March 2018.

General information
During the second series of Dancing on Ice on ITV it was announced that the show would be taken on a UK arena tour. The tour would be presented by former contestant and Dancing on Ice Exclusive host Andi Peters and would feature contestants from all the UK and 1 Australian series of the show competing against each other for audience votes (cast via SMS). Each contestant performed two solo routines for the judges (one was scored by the judges) (Nicky Slater, Jason Gardiner, Karen Barber, Robin Cousins and a guest judges which varied at each location). The two couples with the most votes then proceeded into the 'Bolero Dance-Off'. Following the completion of the dance-off the judges would select a winner decided by a majority verdict. At the end of each show the winner received a trophy. The live show also featured numerous performances from Jayne Torvill and Christopher Dean as well as the professional ice skaters (from the television series) and other special guests.

2007 Tour
The Dancing on Ice Live Tour began on 31 March 2007 and ended on 6 May 2007. Sheffield, London, Manchester, Birmingham, Glasgow, Belfast and Newcastle were among the tour dates. The Sheffeld tour was recorded for the DVD (which was released on 19 November 2007). A preview of the tour was also broadcast on ITV on 21 October 2007. The celebrity guest judges included Radio 1's DJ Letitia, Ian Watkins of Steps and Celebrity Big Brother, former competitor Stephen Gately, and actress Susie Amy. Host Andi Peters was originally set to skate in the show but couldn't as he broke his ankle rehearsing for a routine for Dancing on Ice: Exclusive.

The line-up for the 2007 tour was:

During the tour the two couples with the most votes then competed in a dance-off against each other. The judges then had to decide the winner of the show. A full breakdown of the winners is given below:

Birmingham
31 March afternoon – Claire and Andrei
31 March evening – Bonnie and Matt
1 April afternoon – Kyran and Melanie
1 April evening – Claire and Andrei
2 April evening – Kyran and Melanie
3 April evening – Bonnie & Matt
4 April evening – Bonnie & Matt

Wembley
6 April afternoon – Bonnie & Matt
6 April evening – Bonnie & Matt
7 April afternoon – Bonnie & Matt
7 April evening – Bonnie & Matt
8 April afternoon – Bonnie & Matt
8 April evening – Bonnie & Matt
9 April afternoon – Kyran & Melanie
9 April evening – Bonnie & Matt

Sheffield
11 April evening – Kyran & Melanie
12 April evening – Bonnie & Matt

Manchester
13 April evening – Kyran & Melanie
14 April afternoon – Bonnie & Matt
14 April evening – Duncan & Maria
15 April afternoon – Bonnie & Matt
15 April evening – Kyran & Melanie

Nottingham
17 April evening – Bonnie & Matt
18 April evening – Bonnie & Matt
19 April evening – Kyran & Melanie
20 April evening – Bonnie & Matt

Newcastle
22 April afternoon – Duncan & Maria
22 April evening – Clare & Andrei
23 April evening – Bonnie & Matt

Sheffield
24 April Evening – Bonnie & Matt
25 April Evening – Bonnie & Matt

Glasgow
27 April evening – Duncan & Maria
28 April afternoon – Bonnie & Matt
28 April evening – Bonnie & Matt
29 April afternoon – cancelled due to illness
29 April evening – cancelled due to illness

Belfast
1 May evening – Bonnie & Matt
2 May evening – Bonnie & Matt
3 May evening – Kyran & Melanie

Sheffield
5 May afternoon – Bonnie & Matt
5 May evening – Bonnie & Matt (DVD released version)

Newcastle
6 May afternoon – Bonnie & Matt
6 May evening – Bonnie & Matt

On the final show in Newcastle, Bonnie was given the trophy as she had won the most performances on the tour.

2008 Tour
The Dancing on Ice Live Tour 2008 began on 4 April 2008 in Sheffield and ended on 17 May 2008 also in Sheffield. It also visited London, Newcastle, Nottingham, Liverpool and Birmingham. Torvill and Dean and the judges once again featured on the tour. All performances on 20 April in Birmingham have been recorded for the DVD.

The line-up was:

[*] Chris Fountain appeared only in Friday, Saturday and Sunday performances.

[**] Zaraah Abrahams replaced Michael Underwood

Please, if you go to see the tour at one of these venues, please fill in the table for that show.

 The Ice Panel 
 Robin Cousins
 Karen Barber
 Jason Gardiner
 Nicky Slater
 Guest Judge

There will be a guest judge for every location.
Head Judge Robin Cousins could not make it for two of the Birmingham shows so he was covered by Karen Barber's Husband Steve Pickavance.

 Dancing on Ice Tour 2009 
 The line-up consisted of skaters from previous series and from the 2009 series.
The Bolero Silver Anniversary Tour
Scheduled Dates
Sheffield Arena
Nottingham
Wembley
Manchester
Newcastle
Birmingham
The O2
Belfast Odyssey

Host
Andi Peters

The Ice Panel
Robin Cousins
Karen Barber
Nicky Slater
Ruthie Henshall
Guest Judge

Skaters
Todd Carty and Susie Lipanova
Suzanne Shaw and Łukasz Różycki
Kyran Bracken and Melanie Lambert
Ray Quinn and Maria Filippov
Melinda Messenger and Fred Palascak
Roxanne Pallett and Daniel Whiston
Chris Fountain and Frankie Poultney
Jessica Taylor and Pavel Aubrecht
Zöe Salmon and Matt Evers
Donal MacIntyre and Florentine Houdiniere

Notes
This is the first event Dancing on Ice related that Suzanne's new partner has starred in. Shaw and her new partner only had just over two weeks training together prior to the tour starting.
This is the first time in Dancing on Ice history that Jason Gardiner will not be a judge on.
This is the first tour that hasn't included Kristina Lenko.
Donal & Florentine are only going to perform in the Wembley Shows
Winners of Ice Star 2009, Oxford Freestylers will be performing in the Wembley Shows.
Ray and Maria won a massive 35 shows of the 39. This beats Bonnie's record of 27 wins in 2007.

Dancing on Ice Tour 2010
Dancing on Ice will be going on tour from 8 April 2010 – 9 May 2010 performing in Newcastle, Birmingham, Sheffield, Manchester, Nottingham, Belfast Odyssey and The O2 (London)

Host
Andi Peters

The Ice Panel

Karen Barber
Kyran Bracken
Christopher Biggins
Nicky Slater
 Guest Judge

Skaters
Chris Fountain & Brianne Delcourt (confirmed by Chris on Twitter)
Ray Quinn & Alexandra Schauman
Gaynor Faye & Matt Evers
Mikey Graham & Melanie Lambert
Hayley Tamaddon & Daniel Whiston
Clare Buckfield & Łukasz Różycki (confirmed by Clare on Twitter)
Emily Atack & Fred Palascak
Gary Lucy & Maria Filippov
Danny Young & Frankie Poultney (Sheffield shows only)
Kieron Richardson & Brianne Delcourt (Birmingham Only)

Also Matthew Gonzalez has confirmed on his Twitter page he will be on tour as the male pro reserve. He is mentioned in the tour programme.
Brianne Delcourt has been pulled out of the tour for a while due to a foot infection. Chris Fountain performed solos at the Newcastle shows. Delcourt returned to the tour on 16 April 2010. Our Sudo Air brush Tanning expert to the stars was Lara Norris to the Belfast tour 2010

Torvill & Dean's Dancing on Ice Tour 2011

This year, the tour came to
Capital FM Arena in Nottingham,
Wembley Arena in London,
Sheffield Arena in Sheffield,
Metro Radio Arena in Newcastle,
MEN Arena in Manchester and
National Indoor Arena in Birmingham,
with a record number of tickets being sold. The 2011 tour ran from Saturday 9 April to Monday 2 May.

Host
Andi Peters

The Ice Panel

Robin Cousins
Karen Barber
Christopher Biggins

Skaters

Johnson Beharry & Jodeyne Higgins
Chloe Madeley & Michael Zenezini
Laura Hamilton & Colin Ratushniak
Denise Welch & Matt Evers
Dave Vitty & Nina Ulanova
Hayley Tamaddon & Daniel Whiston
Vanilla Ice & Katie Stainsby
Sam Attwater & Brianne Delcourt
Jeff Brazier & Isabelle Gauthier (only on selected dates)

Sam & Brianne won the 2011 tour with the most wins.

Torvill & Dean's Dancing on Ice Tour 2012

Host
Jayne Torvill & Christopher Dean

The Ice Panel
 Robin Cousins
 Karen Barber (head judge in Robin's absence)
 Christopher Biggins
 Kyran Bracken
 Note: Robin Cousin was not prete for the first two weeks of the tour and Karen Barber only appeared in evening shows.

Skaters
Chico Slimani & Jodeyne Higgins
Heidi Range & Andrei Lipanov
Sam Attwater & Brianne Delcourt
Jorgie Porter & Matt Evers
Matthew Wolfenden & Nina Ulanova
Jennifer Ellison & Daniel Whiston
Andy Whyment & Vicky Ogden
Chemmy Alcott & Sean Rice

Torvill & Dean's Dancing on Ice Tour 2018Dancing on Ice's'' tenth series begins on 7 January 2018. Shortly after the end of the series, the tour starts a week or so later. The tour venues for the 2018 UK tour are: London's Wembley Arena, Sheffield's FlyDSA Arena, Newcastle's Metro Radio Arena, the Manchester Arena, the SSE Hydro in Glasgow, the Motorpoint Arena in Nottingham, and the Birmingham Arena.

Tour dates

Host
Jayne Torvill & Christopher Dean

The Ice Panel
Jayne Torvill & Christopher Dean – Head Judges
Christopher Biggins 
Denise Van Outen – Guest Judge

Skaters
Alex Beresford & Brianne Delcourt
Cheryl Baker & Daniel Whiston
Donna Air & Mark Hanretty
Jake Quickenden & Vanessa Bauer
Kem Cetinay & Alex Murphy 
Max Evans & Ale Izquierdo
Ray Quinn & Alexandra Schauman

References 

Tour
Touring performing arts
Television series by ITV Studios